Oksana Antonenkois a Director at the Global Political Risk team at the UK-based Control Risk consultancy.  She advises businesses and governments on political trends and crisis-management in Europe and Eurasia.

Oksana is also a Visiting Senior Fellow at the Institute for Global Affairs at the London School of Economic and Political Science.  In 2011-2016 Ms. Antonenko was a Senior Political Counsellor at the European Bank for Reconstruction and Development.

In 1996-2011 Oksana was Program Director for Russia and Eurasia at the International Institute for Strategic Studies. Oksana has degrees from Harvard University and Moscow State University

Overview 
Antonenko holds degrees from Moscow State University in Political Economy and Harvard University’s Kennedy School of Government (USA) MPP in International Affairs and Security. She has authored several articles on Russian and CIS subjects for the IISS research program, and published articles in publications such as Survival academic journal, Strategic Comments, International Herald Tribune, New York Times and Russia Profile.

She was named as a British participant to the 2009 Valdai Discussion Club.

Selected publications 
Russia and the European Union: Prospects for a New Relationship. Oksana Antonenko and Kathryn Pinnick (editors). Routledge 2005
A War with No Winners. Survival Vol 5, October–November 2008
"Russia’s Military Co-operation with Middle Eastern and Arab states" in  Armed Forces in the Middle East. Barry Rubin and Thomas Keaney (editors) Frank Cass 2002

References 

Living people
Harvard Kennedy School alumni
Moscow State University alumni
Year of birth missing (living people)